The 1993 AFL season was the 97th season of the Australian Football League (AFL), the highest level senior Australian rules football competition in Australia, which was known as the Victorian Football League until 1989. The season featured fifteen clubs, ran from 26 March until 25 September, and comprised a 20-game home-and-away season followed by a finals series featuring the top six clubs.

The premiership was won by the Essendon Football Club for the 15th time, after it defeated  by 44 points in the 1993 AFL Grand Final.

Foster's Cup
The 1993 Foster's Cup saw Essendon  14.18 (102) defeated Richmond 11.13 (79) in the Grand Final.

Premiership season

Round 1

|- bgcolor="#CCCCFF"
| Home team
| Home team score
| Away team
| Away team score
| Ground
| Crowd
| Date
|- bgcolor="#FFFFFF"
||| 13.17 (95) |||| 17.13 (115) ||MCG || 58,997 ||Friday 26, March
|- bgcolor="#FFFFFF"
||| 24.22 (166) |||| 22.11 (143) ||MCG || 8,653 ||Saturday 27, March
|- bgcolor="#FFFFFF"
||| 13.15 (93) |||| 11.4 (70) ||Waverley Park || 25,098 ||Saturday 27, March
|- bgcolor="#FFFFFF"
||| 17.10 (112) |||| 17.16 (118) ||Princes Park|| 23,433 ||Saturday 27, March
|- bgcolor="#FFFFFF"
||| 20.16 (136) |||| 16.16 (112) ||Kardinia Park || 24,337 ||Saturday 27, March
|- bgcolor="#FFFFFF"
||| 17.21 (123) |||| 17.8 (110) ||Subiaco Oval || 34,361 ||Sunday 28, March
|- bgcolor="#FFFFFF"
||| 12.12 (84) |||| 28.10 (178) ||MCG || 18,473 ||Sunday 28, March

Round 2

|- bgcolor="#CCCCFF"
| Home team
| Home team score
| Away team
| Away team score
| Ground
| Crowd
| Date
|- bgcolor="#FFFFFF"
||| 18.18 (126) |||| 11.14 (80) ||MCG || 14,497 ||Friday 2, April
|- bgcolor="#FFFFFF"
||| 19.18 (132) |||| 19.11 (125) ||Waverley Park || 23,554 ||Saturday 3, April
|- bgcolor="#FFFFFF"
||| 20.12 (132) |||| 19.18 (132) ||MCG || 49,856 ||Saturday 3, April
|- bgcolor="#FFFFFF"
||| 13.17 (95) |||| 15.13 (103) ||Princes Park|| 13,076 ||Saturday 3, April
|- bgcolor="#FFFFFF"
||| 17.11 (113) |||| 15.13 (103) ||Victoria Park|| 24,147 ||Saturday 3, April
|- bgcolor="#FFFFFF"
||| 12.20 (92) |||| 22.17 (149) ||SCG|| 10,144 ||Sunday 4, April
|- bgcolor="#FFFFFF"
||| 15.11 (101) |||| 12.14 (86) ||Football Park || 46,258 ||Sunday 4, April

Round 3

|- bgcolor="#CCCCFF"
| Home team
| Home team score
| Away team
| Away team score
| Ground
| Crowd
| Date
|- bgcolor="#FFFFFF"
||| 20.12 (132) |||| 13.16 (94) ||Waverley Park || 25,351 ||Saturday 10, April
|- bgcolor="#FFFFFF"
||| 14.14 (98) |||| 14.17 (101) ||Princes Park|| 18,265 ||Saturday 10, April
|- bgcolor="#FFFFFF"
||| 17.13 (115) |||| 17.11 (113) ||Gabba|| 12,821 ||Sunday 11, April
|- bgcolor="#FFFFFF"
||| 15.19 (109) |||| 9.11 (65) ||Subiaco Oval || 31,110 ||Sunday 11, April
|- bgcolor="#FFFFFF"
||| 16.16 (112) |||| 16.14 (110) ||Princes Park|| 33,274 ||Monday 12, April
|- bgcolor="#FFFFFF"
||| 13.6 (84) |||| 15.18 (108) ||Kardinia Park || 23,428 ||Monday 12, April
|- bgcolor="#FFFFFF"
||| 16.13 (109) |||| 21.13 (139) ||MCG || 87,638 ||Monday 12, April

Round 4

|- bgcolor="#CCCCFF"
| Home team
| Home team score
| Away team
| Away team score
| Ground
| Crowd
| Date
|- bgcolor="#FFFFFF"
||| 15.13 (103) |||| 15.12 (102) ||Football Park || 45,671 ||Friday 16, April
|- bgcolor="#FFFFFF"
||| 19.14 (128) |||| 14.15 (99) ||MCG || 24,362 ||Saturday 17, April
|- bgcolor="#FFFFFF"
||| 11.13 (79) |||| 18.17 (125) ||Waverley Park || 31,492 ||Saturday 17, April
|- bgcolor="#FFFFFF"
||| 15.14 (104) |||| 18.18 (126) ||Victoria Park|| 28,350 ||Saturday 17, April
|- bgcolor="#FFFFFF"
||| 14.11 (95) |||| 28.13 (181) ||SCG|| 9,023 ||Sunday 18, April
|- bgcolor="#FFFFFF"
||| 14.14 (98) |||| 6.10 (46) ||Subiaco Oval || 30,032 ||Sunday 18, April

Round 5

|- bgcolor="#CCCCFF"
| Home team
| Home team score
| Away team
| Away team score
| Ground
| Crowd
| Date
|- bgcolor="#FFFFFF"
||| 17.20 (122) |||| 25.9 (159) ||MCG || 35,113 ||Friday 23, April
|- bgcolor="#FFFFFF"
||| 24.23 (167) |||| 11.8 (74) ||Princes Park|| 10,257 ||Saturday 24, April
|- bgcolor="#FFFFFF"
||| 20.7 (127) |||| 11.15 (81) ||Whitten Oval || 26,923 ||Saturday 24, April
|- bgcolor="#FFFFFF"
||| 11.12 (78) |||| 17.21 (123) ||Waverley Park || 51,211 ||Sunday 25, April
|- bgcolor="#FFFFFF"
||| 19.12 (126) |||| 18.19 (127) ||Gabba|| 12,996 ||Sunday 25, April
|- bgcolor="#FFFFFF"
||| 10.17 (77) |||| 9.14 (68) ||MCG || 17,011 ||Sunday 25, April

Round 6

Round 7

|- bgcolor="#CCCCFF"
| Home team
| Home team score
| Away team
| Away team score
| Ground
| Crowd
| Date
|- bgcolor="#FFFFFF"
||| 19.22 (136) |||| 16.8 (104) ||MCG || 29,296 ||Saturday 8, May
|- bgcolor="#FFFFFF"
||| 16.17 (113) |||| 10.10 (70) ||Waverley Park || 14,375 ||Saturday 8, May
|- bgcolor="#FFFFFF"
||| 12.7 (79) |||| 11.12 (78) ||Princes Park|| 13,498 ||Saturday 8, May
|- bgcolor="#FFFFFF"
||| 17.8 (110) |||| 22.9 (141) ||Whitten Oval || 20,942 ||Saturday 8, May
|- bgcolor="#FFFFFF"
||| 14.17 (101) |||| 11.10 (76) ||Victoria Park|| 25,854 ||Saturday 8, May
|- bgcolor="#FFFFFF"
||| 13.17 (95) |||| 21.13 (139) ||SCG|| 9,214 ||Sunday 9, May
|- bgcolor="#FFFFFF"
||| 15.15 (105) |||| 16.17 (113) ||Kardinia Park || 23,697 ||Sunday 9, May

Round 8

Round 9

|- bgcolor="#CCCCFF"
| Home team
| Home team score
| Away team
| Away team score
| Ground
| Crowd
| Date
|- bgcolor="#FFFFFF"
||| 20.14 (134) |||| 14.12 (96) ||MCG || 44,833 ||Friday 21, May
|- bgcolor="#FFFFFF"
||| 20.11 (131) |||| 19.7 (121) ||Waverley Park || 20,316 ||Saturday 22, May
|- bgcolor="#FFFFFF"
||| 14.8 (92) |||| 10.13 (73) ||Princes Park|| 24,442 ||Saturday 22, May
|- bgcolor="#FFFFFF"
||| 22.11 (143) |||| 11.13 (79) ||Whitten Oval || 17,458 ||Saturday 22, May
|- bgcolor="#FFFFFF"
||| 16.15 (111) |||| 10.5 (65) ||MCG || 34,372 ||Saturday 22, May
|- bgcolor="#FFFFFF"
||| 15.14 (104) |||| 19.15 (129) ||SCG|| 9,594 ||Sunday 23, May
|- bgcolor="#FFFFFF"
||| 14.17 (101) |||| 13.10 (88) ||MCG || 22,032 ||Sunday 23, May

Round 10

|- bgcolor="#CCCCFF"
| Home team
| Home team score
| Away team
| Away team score
| Ground
| Crowd
| Date
|- bgcolor="#FFFFFF"
||| 19.15 (129) |||| 19.11 (125) ||MCG || 50,567 ||Friday 28, May
|- bgcolor="#FFFFFF"
||| 17.20 (122) |||| 14.9 (93) ||MCG || 17,781 ||Saturday 29, May
|- bgcolor="#FFFFFF"
||| 17.26 (128) |||| 11.8 (74) ||Princes Park|| 23,702 ||Saturday 29, May
|- bgcolor="#FFFFFF"
||| 9.8 (62) |||| 20.12 (132) ||Whitten Oval || 19,397 ||Saturday 29, May
|- bgcolor="#FFFFFF"
||| 9.10 (64) |||| 9.12 (66) ||Waverley Park || 19,918 ||Saturday 29, May
|- bgcolor="#FFFFFF"
||| 5.13 (43) |||| 19.12 (126) ||Victoria Park|| 29,779 ||Saturday 29, May
|- bgcolor="#FFFFFF"
||| 12.13 (85) |||| 18.14 (122) ||Gabba|| 12,395 ||Sunday 30, May

Round 11

|- bgcolor="#CCCCFF"
| Home team
| Home team score
| Away team
| Away team score
| Ground
| Crowd
| Date
|- bgcolor="#FFFFFF"
||| 7.14 (56) |||| 12.10 (82) ||Princes Park|| 11,366 ||Saturday 12, June
|- bgcolor="#FFFFFF"
||| 20.10 (130) |||| 11.9 (75) ||Waverley Park || 11,748 ||Saturday 12, June
|- bgcolor="#FFFFFF"
||| 13.11 (89) |||| 17.16 (118) ||MCG || 37,119 ||Saturday 12, June
|- bgcolor="#FFFFFF"
||| 10.3 (63) |||| 17.18 (120) ||SCG|| 8,794 ||Sunday 13, June
|- bgcolor="#FFFFFF"
||| 15.17 (107) |||| 8.14 (62) ||Football Park || 44,979 ||Sunday 13, June
|- bgcolor="#FFFFFF"
||| 24.16 (160) |||| 16.13 (109) ||MCG || 57,833 ||Monday 14, June
|- bgcolor="#FFFFFF"
||| 12.14 (86) |||| 17.14 (116) ||Waverley Park || 47,295 ||Monday 14, June

Round 12

|- bgcolor="#CCCCFF"
| Home team
| Home team score
| Away team
| Away team score
| Ground
| Crowd
| Date
|- bgcolor="#FFFFFF"
||| 15.11 (101) |||| 16.11 (107) ||WACA|| 30,183 ||Friday 18, June
|- bgcolor="#FFFFFF"
||| 15.15 (105) |||| 10.11 (71) ||MCG || 44,094 ||Saturday 19, June
|- bgcolor="#FFFFFF"
||| 23.14 (152) |||| 11.8 (74) ||Waverley Park || 28,975 ||Saturday 19, June
|- bgcolor="#FFFFFF"
||| 13.16 (94) |||| 10.9 (69) ||Whitten Oval || 11,797 ||Saturday 19, June
|- bgcolor="#FFFFFF"
||| 24.12 (156) |||| 11.11 (77) ||Princes Park|| 21,405 ||Saturday 19, June
|- bgcolor="#FFFFFF"
||| 16.17 (113) |||| 15.16 (106) ||Kardinia Park || 19,308 ||Sunday 20, June
|- bgcolor="#FFFFFF"
||| 14.13 (97) |||| 20.18 (138) ||Gabba|| 15,471 ||Sunday 20, June

Round 13

|- bgcolor="#CCCCFF"
| Home team
| Home team score
| Away team
| Away team score
| Ground
| Crowd
| Date
|- bgcolor="#FFFFFF"
||| 11.14 (80) |||| 12.11 (83) ||MCG || 47,705 ||Friday 25, June
|- bgcolor="#FFFFFF"
||| 12.7 (79) |||| 17.10 (112) ||Waverley Park || 15,181 ||Saturday 26, June
|- bgcolor="#FFFFFF"
||| 21.15 (141) |||| 8.15 (63) ||Princes Park|| 19,105 ||Saturday 26, June
|- bgcolor="#FFFFFF"
||| 17.19 (121) |||| 14.9 (93) ||Whitten Oval || 15,397 ||Saturday 26, June
|- bgcolor="#FFFFFF"
||| 11.5 (71) |||| 14.10 (94) ||Victoria Park|| 24,371 ||Saturday 26, June
|- bgcolor="#FFFFFF"
||| 23.11 (149) |||| 16.13 (109) ||SCG|| 8,250 ||Sunday 27, June
|- bgcolor="#FFFFFF"
||| 16.19 (115) |||| 14.11 (95) ||Football Park || 46,496 ||Sunday 27, June

Round 14

|- bgcolor="#CCCCFF"
| Home team
| Home team score
| Away team
| Away team score
| Ground
| Crowd
| Date
|- bgcolor="#FFFFFF"
||| 12.10 (82) |||| 18.18 (126) ||SCG|| 13,057 ||Friday 2, July
|- bgcolor="#FFFFFF"
||| 23.17 (155) |||| 4.15 (39) ||MCG || 20,453 ||Saturday 3, July
|- bgcolor="#FFFFFF"
||| 6.10 (46) |||| 14.8 (92) ||Waverley Park || 23,398 ||Saturday 3, July
|- bgcolor="#FFFFFF"
||| 18.11 (119) |||| 17.16 (118) ||Princes Park|| 13,965 ||Saturday 3, July
|- bgcolor="#FFFFFF"
||| 15.20 (110) |||| 8.6 (54) ||Kardinia Park || 19,293 ||Saturday 3, July
|- bgcolor="#FFFFFF"
||| 13.13 (91) |||| 14.8 (92) ||Subiaco Oval || 39,789 ||Sunday 4, July
|- bgcolor="#FFFFFF"
||| 17.15 (117) |||| 22.15 (147) ||MCG || 49,980 ||Sunday 4, July

Round 15

|- bgcolor="#CCCCFF"
| Home team
| Home team score
| Away team
| Away team score
| Ground
| Crowd
| Date
|- bgcolor="#FFFFFF"
||| 19.15 (129) |||| 13.13 (91) ||MCG || 55,693 ||Friday 9, July
|- bgcolor="#FFFFFF"
||| 15.20 (110) |||| 9.10 (64) ||Waverley Park || 21,744 ||Saturday 10, July
|- bgcolor="#FFFFFF"
||| 19.17 (131) |||| 14.13 (97) ||Princes Park|| 16,934 ||Saturday 10, July
|- bgcolor="#FFFFFF"
||| 25.19 (169) |||| 11.11 (77) ||Victoria Park|| 20,394 ||Saturday 10, July
|- bgcolor="#FFFFFF"
||| 22.9 (141) |||| 20.7 (127) ||MCG || 40,819 ||Saturday 10, July
|- bgcolor="#FFFFFF"
||| 23.18 (156) |||| 8.15 (63) ||Football Park || 46,667 ||Sunday 11, July
|- bgcolor="#FFFFFF"
||| 8.14 (62) |||| 10.18 (78) ||MCG || 24,832 ||Sunday 11, July

Round 16

Round 17

|- bgcolor="#CCCCFF"
| Home team
| Home team score
| Away team
| Away team score
| Ground
| Crowd
| Date
|- bgcolor="#FFFFFF"
||| 14.13 (97) |||| 16.16 (112) ||MCG || 28,410 ||Friday 23, July
|- bgcolor="#FFFFFF"
||| 13.9 (87) |||| 11.13 (79) ||Waverley Park || 38,166 ||Saturday 24, July
|- bgcolor="#FFFFFF"
||| 14.13 (97) |||| 16.14 (110) ||Whitten Oval || 14,469 ||Saturday 24, July
|- bgcolor="#FFFFFF"
||| 12.11 (83) |||| 15.14 (104) ||MCG || 67,035 ||Saturday 24, July
|- bgcolor="#FFFFFF"
||| 18.10 (118) |||| 14.15 (99) ||Gabba|| 8,797 ||Sunday 25, July
|- bgcolor="#FFFFFF"
||| 24.15 (159) |||| 9.13 (67) ||Waverley Park || 13,397 ||Sunday 25, July
|- bgcolor="#FFFFFF"
||| 15.17 (107) |||| 10.10 (70) ||Subiaco Oval || 36,081 ||Sunday 25, July

Round 18

|- bgcolor="#CCCCFF"
| Home team
| Home team score
| Away team
| Away team score
| Ground
| Crowd
| Date
|- bgcolor="#FFFFFF"
||| 7.13 (55) |||| 18.15 (123) ||MCG || 87,573 ||Friday 30, July
|- bgcolor="#FFFFFF"
||| 10.12 (72) |||| 25.16 (166) ||MCG || 34,439 ||Saturday 31, July
|- bgcolor="#FFFFFF"
||| 22.14 (146) |||| 13.6 (84) ||Whitten Oval || 13,029 ||Saturday 31, July
|- bgcolor="#FFFFFF"
||| 11.15 (81) |||| 15.10 (100) ||Princes Park|| 6,025 ||Saturday 31, July
|- bgcolor="#FFFFFF"
||| 13.13 (91) |||| 17.20 (122) ||Waverley Park || 40,850 ||Saturday 31, July
|- bgcolor="#FFFFFF"
||| 17.16 (118) |||| 24.11 (155) ||SCG|| 9,756 ||Sunday 1, August
|- bgcolor="#FFFFFF"
||| 20.18 (138) |||| 6.13 (49) ||MCG || 15,664 ||Sunday 1, August

Round 19

|- bgcolor="#CCCCFF"
| Home team
| Home team score
| Away team
| Away team score
| Ground
| Crowd
| Date
|- bgcolor="#FFFFFF"
||| 18.9 (117) |||| 13.18 (96) ||MCG || 22,813 ||Friday 6, August
|- bgcolor="#FFFFFF"
||| 12.11 (83) |||| 16.10 (106) ||MCG || 30,874 ||Saturday 7, August
|- bgcolor="#FFFFFF"
||| 9.14 (68) |||| 10.20 (80) ||Waverley Park || 40,327 ||Saturday 7, August
|- bgcolor="#FFFFFF"
||| 15.9 (99) |||| 13.16 (94) ||Princes Park|| 8,545 ||Saturday 7, August
|- bgcolor="#FFFFFF"
||| 22.18 (150) |||| 10.8 (68) ||Kardinia Park || 25,817 ||Saturday 7, August
|- bgcolor="#FFFFFF"
||| 10.11 (71) |||| 19.17 (131) ||Gabba|| 9,046 ||Sunday 8, August

Round 20

|- bgcolor="#CCCCFF"
| Home team
| Home team score
| Away team
| Away team score
| Ground
| Crowd
| Date
|- bgcolor="#FFFFFF"
||| 15.9 (99) |||| 17.12 (114) ||SCG|| 8,214 ||Friday 13, August
|- bgcolor="#FFFFFF"
||| 10.17 (77) |||| 11.18 (84) ||Princes Park|| 22,774 ||Saturday 14, August
|- bgcolor="#FFFFFF"
||| 14.14 (98) |||| 12.13 (85) ||MCG || 40,229 ||Saturday 14, August
|- bgcolor="#FFFFFF"
||| 10.7 (67) |||| 6.9 (45) ||Subiaco Oval || 41,988 ||Sunday 15, August
|- bgcolor="#FFFFFF"
||| 19.14 (128) |||| 11.18 (84) ||MCG || 17,585 ||Sunday 15, August
|- bgcolor="#FFFFFF"
||| 13.27 (105) |||| 6.10 (46) ||Football Park || 46,310 ||Sunday 15, August

Round 21

|- bgcolor="#CCCCFF"
| Home team
| Home team score
| Away team
| Away team score
| Ground
| Crowd
| Date
|- bgcolor="#FFFFFF"
||| 22.15 (147) |||| 5.13 (43) ||Princes Park|| 6,214 ||Saturday 21, August
|- bgcolor="#FFFFFF"
||| 19.12 (126) |||| 14.10 (94) ||Kardinia Park || 32,808 ||Saturday 21, August
|- bgcolor="#FFFFFF"
||| 8.15 (63) |||| 17.15 (117) ||MCG || 84,054 ||Saturday 21, August
|- bgcolor="#FFFFFF"
||| 17.13 (115) |||| 13.10 (88) ||Waverley Park || 26,540 ||Saturday 21, August
|- bgcolor="#FFFFFF"
||| 14.10 (94) |||| 7.10 (52) ||Whitten Oval || 12,444 ||Saturday 21, August
|- bgcolor="#FFFFFF"
||| 8.6 (54) |||| 26.19 (175) ||MCG || 21,654 ||Sunday 22, August
|- bgcolor="#FFFFFF"
||| 14.14 (98) |||| 25.10 (160) ||SCG|| 8,180 ||Sunday 22, August

Round 22

|- bgcolor="#CCCCFF"
| Home team
| Home team score
| Away team
| Away team score
| Ground
| Crowd
| Date
|- bgcolor="#FFFFFF"
||| 14.12 (96) |||| 17.14 (116) ||WACA|| 32,121 ||Friday 27, August
|- bgcolor="#FFFFFF"
||| 18.17 (125) |||| 12.10 (82) ||Waverley Park || 22,971 ||Saturday 28, August
|- bgcolor="#FFFFFF"
||| 16.15 (111) |||| 16.14 (110) ||Princes Park|| 21,900 ||Saturday 28, August
|- bgcolor="#FFFFFF"
||| 18.15 (123) |||| 20.15 (135) ||MCG || 31,109 ||Saturday 28, August
|- bgcolor="#FFFFFF"
||| 15.16 (106) |||| 24.19 (163) ||Gabba|| 11,544 ||Sunday 29, August
|- bgcolor="#FFFFFF"
||| 11.9 (75) |||| 14.14 (98) ||MCG || 22,605 ||Sunday 29, August
|- bgcolor="#FFFFFF"
||| 19.21 (135) |||| 17.9 (111) ||Football Park || 48,522 ||Sunday 29, August

Ladder
All teams played 20 games during the home and away season, for a total of 150. Each team also had two byes.

Finals series

Week one

Week two

Week three

Week four

Awards
The Brownlow Medal was awarded to Gavin Wanganeen of Essendon. 
The AFLPA MVP was awarded to Gary Ablett of Geelong. 
The Coleman Medal was awarded to Gary Ablett of Geelong. 
The Norm Smith Medal was awarded to Michael Long of Essendon. 
The inaugural AFL Rising Star award was awarded to Nathan Buckley of Brisbane. 
The Wooden Spoon was "awarded" to Sydney.
The Reserves Grand Final was won by Melbourne against North Melbourne
The Section 1 State of Origin was won by South Australia against Victoria
The Section 2 State of Origin was won by Queensland-Northern Territory against Tasmania

Notable events
Following the release of the Crawford Report, prepared by insolvency expert David Crawford, the clubs voted to make several significant changes to the administrative structure of the AFL during the 1993 season:
 Firstly, the AFL Commission was expanded from six members to eight, and was given the power to make most administrative decisions relating to the league unilaterally (as opposed to ratification by a vote of club presidents).
 Secondly, the AFL Board of Directors, after 96 years of operation, voted itself out of existence.
 Thirdly, the clubs retained the right to veto any Commission decision by a two-thirds majority.
 Fourthly, with several Victorian clubs, as well as Brisbane and Sydney, being concerned about their long-term viability at the time, a stipulation was also included that any decisions relating to the expulsion, merger or relocation of any club required ratification by a simple majority of all clubs, and the agreement of the club(s) in question.
 Brisbane played their first home game at their new home, the Brisbane Cricket Ground against Melbourne in Round 3, which resulted in a win.
 At the conclusion of their Round 4 game against Collingwood, St Kilda's Nicky Winmar responded to racial vilification from the Collingwood cheer squad by declaring, "I'm black and proud of it!" while raising his jumper and pointing to his skin, an image which has since become famous. This was also St Kilda's first win at Victoria Park in two decades.
 Brisbane and North Melbourne both set club-record high scores in this season. North Melbourne's 35.19 (229) in Round 6 was then the fifth-highest score of all time, and Brisbane's 33.21 (219) in Round 8 was then the tenth-highest of all time. The opponent in both of these games was Sydney.
 In Round 18, a piglet with the word "PLUGA" and the number four painted on it was released onto the Sydney Cricket Ground during the match between Sydney and St Kilda; play was held up for two to three minutes as it managed to evade capture from trainers, security guards and players. The idea to release the pig had been devised by a small group of Sydney supporters and players the previous week, and was intended as a tactic to put dangerous St Kilda full-forward Tony "Plugger" Lockett off his game. As it happened, Lockett missed the game with injury, but was reportedly enraged when he saw the incident on television.

References

External links
 1993 Season - AFL Tables

 
AFL season
Australian Football League seasons